Hello Chapter 2: Hello, Strange Place is the second extended play by South Korean boy group CIX. It was released on November 19, 2019 by C9 Entertainment and distributed by Warner Music Korea. The EP consists of five tracks including the single "Numb".

Background and release 
On September 27, 2019, it was announced that CIX would have a comeback in November 2019. On November 1, it was revealed that CIX would return with their second EP Hello Chapter 2: Hello, Strange Place on November 19.

The music video teaser for "Numb" was released on November 18 and full music video on November 19.

"Numb" is a hip hop dance track that addresses the problem of teenagers being forced to stay quiet during unfair situations and growing "numb" after losing their dreams.

Promotion 
CIX held a live showcase alongside the release of the EP on November 20 where they performed "Numb". The group started promoting their title track "Numb" on November 22. They first performed the lead single on KBS' Music Bank followed by performances on MBC's Show! Music Core and SBS's Inkigayo and  Mnet's M Countdown.

Track listing

Charts

Release history

References 

Korean-language EPs
CIX (band) albums
2019 EPs